Emilia Guiú Estivella (March 21, 1922 – February 7, 2004) was a Spanish-Mexican actress who appeared mainly in Mexican films, particularly in the 1940s and 1950s in the Golden Age of Mexican cinema. She made over 60 film appearances between 1943 and 2000 and typically played villain roles and "femme fatale". She also made a number of theatrical appearances.

Career
Guiu left Spain with her family, during the Spanish Civil War. In 1943 she moved to Mexico and shortly after arriving, she discovered that a Spanish film director needed migrants as hired extras. This brought about her debut role in Flor silvestre (1943). In 1944 she had a small role in Roberto Rodríguez's comedy, ¡Viva mi desgracia! as a jailer woman at the fair and further smaller roles that year including El abanico de Lady Windermere, under the helm of Juan José Ortega and Fernando Fuentes's El rey se divierte. Her first leading role came in 1945 in the musical drama film Club verde, directed by Raphael J. Sevilla, in which she starred opposite Emilio Tuero and Celia Montalván. In 1961 she appeared in Confidencias matrimoniales, which would be her last performance on screen for 22 years as she moved into theatrical acting. She returned to the cinema in 1983, in the film Las modelos de desnudos.

Guiú made her last performance in the Mexican telenovela Abrázame muy fuerte in 2000. She died on February 7, 2004, in San Diego, California, from cancer.

Filmography
Wild Flower (1943)
El Rebelde (1943)
¡Viva mi desgracia!(1944)
El Herrero (1944)
La vida inútil de Pito Pérez (1944)
Nana (1944)
El Rosario (1944)
El médico de las locas (1944)
El abanico de Lady Windermere(1944)
El Rey se divierte (1944)
Nosotros (1945)
Club verde (En México, Recuerdo de un Vals) (1945)
 I Am a Fugitive (1946)
Amar es vivir (1946)
Pervertida (1946)
Nuestros maridos (1946)
Mujer contra mujer (1946)
Bel Ami (En México, El Buen Mozo o La historia de un canalla) (1947)
 The Lost Child (1947)
Pecadora (1947)
La mujer del otro (1948)
Matrimonio sintético (1948)
Enrédate y verás (1948)
Little Black Angels (1948)
Paz (1949)
Carta Brava (1949)
Dos almas en el mundo (1949)
Mujeres en mi vida (1950)
Quinto patio (1950)
Traces of the Past (1950)
Furia roja (1951)
Una viuda sin sostén (1951)
Buenas noches mi amor (1951)
 The Lovers (1951)
Monte de piedad (1951)
Puerto de tentación (1951)
Radio patrulla (1951)
Mujeres de teatro (1951)
 Paco the Elegant (1952)
La noche es nuestra (1952)
Vive como sea (1952)
Prefiero a tu papá (1952)
¡Amor, qué malo eres! (1953)
La extraña pasajera (1953)
El último round (1953)
Angels of the Street (1953) 
Píntame angelitos blancos (1954)
Solamente una vez (1954)
Sindicato de telemirones (1954)
De ranchero a empresario (1954)
Maternidad imposible (1955)
Ladrones de niños (1958)
Mujeres encantadoras (1958)
Señoritas (1959)
Siete pecados (1959)
Pancho villa y la Valentina (1960)
Confidencias matrimoniales (1961)
Las modelos de desnudos (1983)
Cacería de un criminal (1984)
Corrupción (1984)
Siempre en domingo (1984)
Abrázame muy fuerte (Serie de televisión) (2000)

References

Further reading
Agrasánchez, Jr., Rogelio (2001). Bellezas del cine mexicano/Beauties of Mexican Cinema. México: Archivo Fílmico Agrasánchez. p. 134. 
Varios (2002). Inolvidables rostros de nuestro cine. En SOMOS. México: Editorial Televisa, S. A. de C.V.
Varios (2000). Época de oro del cine mexicano de la A a la Z. En SOMOS. México: Editorial Televisa, S. A. de C.V.

External links
 

1922 births
2004 deaths
Mexican film actresses
Spanish film actresses
People from Manresa
Spanish emigrants to Mexico